The 2022 NCAA Division III baseball tournament will be the 46th edition of the NCAA Division III baseball tournament. The 60-team tournament began on Friday, May 20 as part of the 2022 NCAA Division III baseball season and conclude with the 2022 Division III College World Series in Cedar Rapids, Iowa, which will start on June 3 and end on June 9.

The 60 participating NCAA Division III college baseball teams will be selected out of an eligible 389 teams. There will be 41 teams awarded an automatic bid as champions of their conferences, 1 team selected who cannot earn an automatic bid, and 18 teams selected at-large by the NCAA Division III Baseball Committee. Teams will be divided into fourteen regionals of four teams, each of which conducts a double-elimination tournament, and two regionals of two teams, each of which conducts a best-of-five series. Regional champions then will face each other in Super Regionals, a best-of-three game series, to determine the eight participants in the College World Series.

Tournament procedure 
A total of 60 teams will enter the tournament, with 41 of them receiving an automatic bid by winning their conference's tournament. 1 bid is reserved for teams who cannot earn an automatic bid, while the remaining 18 bids are "at-large", with selections extended by the NCAA Selection Committee.

Schedule and venues 
On May 16, the NCAA Division III Baseball Committee will announce the sixteen regional host sites.

Regionals
May 20–22
TBD

Super Regionals
May 27–28
TBD

College World Series
June 3–9
Veterans Memorial Stadium, Cedar Rapids, Iowa (Host: American Rivers Conference)

Bids

Automatic bids

By conference

Regionals and Super Regionals
Bold indicates winner. Seeds for regional tournaments indicate seeds within regional.  Seeds for super regional tournaments indicate national seeds only.

Birmingham Super Regional

Willimantic Super Regional

Beverly Super Regional

Ithaca Super Regional

LaGrange Super Regional

Marietta Super Regional

Salisbury Super Regional

Whitewater Super Regional

College World Series
The College World Series will be held at Veterans Memorial Stadium in Cedar Rapids, Iowa.

Bracket

See also
 2022 NCAA Division I baseball tournament
 2022 NCAA Division II baseball tournament
 2022 NCAA Division I softball tournament

References

External links
Official Bracket at NCAA.com

Tournament
NCAA Division III baseball tournament
NCAA Division III baseball tournament
NCAA Division III Baseball Tournament